Carlotta Natoli (born 29 May 1971) is an Italian actress.

Life and career 
Born in Rome, the daughter of Piero Natoli, she made her film debut in 1980, at the age of eight years, in her father's semi-autobiographical indie film Con... fusione. She later studied acting at the Actors Studio in New York, and in early 1990s she started a professional career as an actress in films, television and on stage. In 1995 Natoli received a nomination for Nastro d'Argento for Best Supporting Actress thanks to her performance in L'estate di Bobby Charlton.  In 2000s she had regular roles in the successful TV-series Distretto di Polizia and Tutti pazzi per amore.

References

External links 
 

Italian film actresses
Italian television actresses
Italian stage actresses
1971 births
Actresses from Rome
Living people
Actors Studio alumni